"Somewhere Somehow" is a song by Scottish band Wet Wet Wet, released as the fourth single from their fourth studio album, Picture This (1995), on 18 September 1995. The song reached number seven on the UK and Irish Singles Charts. Marti Pellow recorded his own version of the song for inclusion on his 2002 album, Marti Pellow Sings the Hits of Wet Wet Wet & Smile.

Track listings

UK CD1
 "Somewhere Somehow"
 "All You Need Is Love" (live from Glasgow SE&CC)
 "Somewhere Somehow" (live from Glasgow SE&CC)
 "She Might Never Know" (live from Sheffield Arena)

UK CD2
 "Somewhere Somehow"
 "Roll 'Um Easy" (live from London Arena)
 "Celebration" (live from Wembley Arena)
 "Gypsy Girl" (live from Manchester Arena)

UK cassette single
 "Somewhere Somehow"
 "Morning" (1995 Youth remix)
 "Somewhere Somehow" (synth string version)

European CD single
 "Somewhere Somehow"
 "Morning" (1995 Youth remix)

Credits and personnel
Credits are lifted from the UK CD1 liner notes and the Picture This album booklet.

Studios
 Recorded between November 1994 and January 1995 at Miraval (Var, France) and Whitfield Street (London, England)

Personnel

 Wet Wet Wet – production, arrangement
 Graeme Clark – writing, fretless bass, assorted basses, production
 Tommy Cunningham – writing, drums, percussion
 Neil Mitchell – writing, keyboards, piano
 Marti Pellow – writing, vocals
 Fiachra Trench – orchestration

 Graeme Duffin – all guitars, production
 Bob Clearmountain – mixing
 Ian Morrow – programming
 Simon Vinestock – engineering
 Andrew Boland – string engineering

Charts

References

1995 singles
1995 songs
Mercury Records singles
Songs written by Graeme Clark (musician)
Songs written by Marti Pellow
Songs written by Neil Mitchell (musician)
Songs written by Tommy Cunningham
Wet Wet Wet songs